is a multi-purpose stadium at the Tochigi Prefectural General Sports Park in Utsunomiya, Tochigi, Japan.  The stadium was originally opened in 2020 and has a capacity of 25,244 spectators.

References

External links
Stadium Tochigi

Football venues in Japan
Rugby union stadiums in Japan
Multi-purpose stadiums in Japan
Tochigi SC
Sports venues in Tochigi Prefecture
Athletics (track and field) venues in Japan
Utsunomiya
Sports venues completed in 2020
2020 establishments in Japan